Mahajana Party may refer to:

Sri Lanka Mahajana Party, founded in 1984
Lanka Mahajana Sabha, a Ceylonese political party founded in 1919
Mahajana Socialist Party, an Indian political party founded in 2014